This is a list of the number-one hits of 1961 on Italian Hit Parade Singles Chart.

See also
1961 in music
List of number-one hits in Italy

References

1961 in Italian music
1961 record charts
1961